King Island Airport  is a small regional airport located near the town of Currie on King Island off the north-west coast of Tasmania, Australia. The airport is owned and operated by the King Island Council.

Airlines and destinations

Passenger

Cargo

Accidents and incidents
The airport was the site of a light plane crash on 26 November 1998, when a Piper Lance crashed shortly after takeoff on its way to Moorabbin, Victoria, killing three Melbourne nurses on board. It was suspected that a strong gust of wind just after takeoff caused the plane to stall and crash.

See also
 List of airports in Tasmania

References

External links
King Island Council: King Island Airport

Airports in Tasmania
King Island (Tasmania)